A "high profile" Federal judge of Canada, Carolyn Layden-Stevenson has ruled on a number of cases and motions involving suspects accused of links to militant and terrorist organisations.

Life
Born in Saint John, New Brunswick, Layden studied at the New Brunswick Teachers' College, St. Thomas University and University of New Brunswick, and worked as a guidance counsellor and teacher until 1981. She was called to the Bar four years later, and made partner at Stevenson & Stevenson in Fredericton the following year. After seventeen years with the firm, she was appointed Judge of the Federal Court of Canada, Trial Division and ex officio member of the Court of Appeal. She was appointed to the Federal Court of Appeal on December 12, 2008.

Death
Carolyn Layden-Stevenson died of natural causes on June 27, 2012 in Ottawa, Ontario.

References

Year of birth missing (living people)
Living people
Canadian educators
Judges of the Federal Court of Appeal (Canada)
Canadian women judges